Sofia Starnes was the Poet Laureate of Virginia from 2012 to 2014.

References

Year of birth missing (living people)
Living people
American women poets
Poets Laureate of Virginia
21st-century American poets
21st-century American women writers